The Grette is a little area of Besançon, located near the center of the city.

Etymology 
The name "Grette" comes from the verb "gratter", meaning "to scrape" and refers to the removal of stones from the ground before it can be cultivated.

History 
The first mention of the name "greete" was in 1544. In the 1950s, a few  buildings were built.

Geography 
The sector is located near the historical center of Besançon, between Butte, Velotte and  Saint-Ferjeux. The river Doubs is one hundred meters from the area.

Education 
 Veilles Perrières  public kindergarten 
 Public Primary School of Grette 
 Veilles Perrières Public Primary School

Shops 
 Hairdresser
 Beerhouse

Place of worship 
 Chapel of Saint-Thérése

Military Buildings 
 Military barracks of Ruty

Other administrative buildings 
 1901 center, an association

Roads 
 The principal road is the avenue of François Mitterrand, linking the district to Planoise. 
 Polygon Street links the area to the Butte.

Transport 
The Ginko company (bus) manages urban transport in the city. 

 Week and days: lines 1, 3, 5 and 10 
 Evenings and Sundays: line A

See also 
 The 408
 Butte
 Planoise

References 

Areas of Besançon